Zachariah Chandler is a statue depicting the politician of the same name by Charles Henry Niehaus, formerly installed in Washington, D.C., representing the U.S. state of Michigan in the National Statuary Hall Collection. In 2011, the statue was relocated to the atrium of Lansing's Constitution Hall, and replaced by another depicting Gerald Ford.

References

Culture of Lansing, Michigan
Chandler
Monuments and memorials in Michigan
Sculptures of men in Michigan
Statues in Michigan